Seleme may refer to:

People
Antonio Seleme, Bolivian military leader and Minister of Government under Hugo Ballivián who supported a coup
Jaime Humérez Seleme, Bolivian politician, leader in Social Christian Party (Bolivia), Minister of Press in the Government of Celso Torrelio Villa, 1981–1982
Jorge Seleme, District 1 candidate in the Chilean parliamentary election, 2009

Other
Seleme, a track on the album Yasteseryal Edition 2 by Ethiopian singer Teddy Afro
Seleme se setshehadi (Sesotho: female planter); see Pleiades in folklore and literature

See also
Selene (disambiguation)
Semele (disambiguation)